Myrmicaria natalensis, commonly known as the Natal droptail ant, is a species of ant with an extensive range in the Afrotropics. It has been recorded from Guinea, Ivory Coast, Uganda, DRC, Tanzania, Mozambique, Angola, Namibia and South Africa, where the type was obtained. Like others in its genus, it has a distinctive down-curved gaster and spines on the mesosoma.

References

External links

Taxonomic details and photographs at antsofafrica.org

Myrmicinae
Insects described in 1858